Daiki Niwa may refer to:

 Daiki Niwa (D.N.Angel), a character in the manga series D.N.Angel
 Daiki Niwa (footballer) (born 1986), Japanese footballer